The Northeast Conference (NEC) Women's Basketball Player of the Year is an annual college basketball award given to the Northeast Conference's most outstanding player. The award was first given following the 1986–87 season.

Winners

Winners by school

References

NCAA Division I women's basketball conference players of the year
Player
Awards established in 1987